Stacey Nicole English (June 1, 1975-January 23, 2012) was reported missing from Atlanta, Georgia by her family on December 27, 2011. Her body was discovered on January 23, 2012, and the autopsy indicates the death was accidental.

Disappearance 
According to her family, English was last seen in her home in Atlanta, Georgia on or about Christmas Day. When her home was investigated, it was discovered that both her apartment gate fob and her cell phone had been left, and the fireplace was still on. She was believed to be driving a white 2006 Volvo S60, which was later found abandoned. Police told reporters that there was no indication of foul play.

Investigation 
Investigators cleared St. Louis event promoter Robert Kirk, from being a person of interest in English's disappearance, on January 20, 2012. Kirk was reportedly the last person to see English.

Discovery of body 
Men looking for scrap metal discovered human remains underneath a fallen tree in Atlanta on January 23, 2012. Initial reports from the Chief Medical Examiner of Georgia, indicated that the remains were consistent with the age and gender of English. The medical examiner's report ruled that her death was most likely cold exposure (hypothermia), complicating underlying neurological and psychiatric disorders.

Her parents released a statement when her body was discovered, which stated;

See also
List of solved missing person cases

References 

2010s missing person cases
2011 in Georgia (U.S. state)
Formerly missing people
1975 births
2012 deaths
December 2011 events in the United States
Missing person cases in Georgia (U.S. state)
2011 in Atlanta